Kraz may refer to:
 KrAZ, a Ukrainian truck manufacturer
 Kraz, the proper name of the star Beta Corvi
 KRAZ, call sign FM radio station in Santa Barbara, California